The 1938 Paris–Nice was the sixth edition of the Paris–Nice cycle race and was held from 23 March to 27 March 1938. The race started in Paris and finished in Nice. The race was won by Jules Lowie.

General classification

References

1938
1938 in road cycling
1938 in French sport
March 1938 sports events